The Political Graveyard is a website and database that catalogues information on more than 277,000 American political figures and political families, along with other information. The name comes from the website's inclusion of burial locations of the deceased (when known). It is also a pun; where bodies are buried can refer to the politicians accused of crimes or touched by scandal.

History
The site was created in 1996 by Lawrence Kestenbaum, then an academic specialist at Michigan State University, and later on staff at the University of Michigan.

Kestenbaum was formerly a county commissioner, and in 2004 was elected to be County Clerk/Register of Deeds of Washtenaw County, Michigan. The site and its underlying database were developed from a personal interest triggered by the Biographical Directory of the U.S. Congress, which was its original data source. Since then his personal research, and the information contributions of hundreds of volunteers have greatly expanded the information available. It is licensed under the "Attribution-NonCommercial-ShareAlike 1.0" Creative Commons License.

Over the years the definition of "eligible political figure" has been expanded. It now includes most high federal officials, ambassadors, all elected and some appointed statewide officeholders, and many mayors. It lists unsuccessful candidates, presidential electors, and delegates to U.S. presidential nominating conventions of the major political parties.

The database attempts to capture very basic biographical and office-holding data for its political figures. Besides where they are buried, cause of death is broken down into dozens of categories.

Politicians are listed alphabetically, by office held or sought, and by dates and locations of birth, residence, and death. The names are sorted and indexed by surname, birthplace, positions held, demography, geography, religion, occupation, cause of death, and final resting place.

Some are listed in categories, including occupations, ethnicity, religious and organizational affiliation, honors, and awards. "For example, 18 politicians were born into slavery; six have been in space; 69 survived assassination attempts; and 908 were in trouble or disgraced." An exhaustive cataloging of transgressions are listed by the nature of the accusation, as well as by decade and by state.

It reports their relation (at least by blood and marriage) with other politicians listed, their political party, and limited military history. The site also lists political families. Individuals listed on the site are linked together if their relationship meets the Rule of 1/1000 common ancestry. Each cluster of three or more linked politicians is treated as a family, with family name and location assigned by an algorithm; the largest individual family cluster is the Kennedys, with 34 members. The site's largest cluster, with 2,134 members, is called "Two Thousand Related Politicians"; most of the larger families are subsets of this group, with each subset defined and named by an algorithm. The largest subset family is the Huntington-Chapin-Waterman family of Connecticut, with 229 members.

References

American genealogy websites
Political history of the United States
Internet properties established in 1996
Political databases
Genealogy databases
Databases in the United States